Fredrik Liverstam (born 4 March 1988) is a Swedish footballer who plays as a defender.

References

External links
 
 

Swedish footballers
1988 births
Living people
Högaborgs BK players
Helsingborgs IF players
Landskrona BoIS players
Halmstads BK players
Trelleborgs FF players
Allsvenskan players
Superettan players
Association football defenders
Sportspeople from Helsingborg